Francisco José Pereira de Assis Miranda (born 8 January 1965, in Amarante) is a Portuguese politician who served as a Member of the European Parliament (MEP) for the Socialist Party; part of the Party of European Socialists from 2004 to 2009, and again from 2014 until 2019. He is also a former mayor of Amarante, having been in office from 1989 to 1995, and member of the Assembly of Republic, for two time occasions, the first from 1995 to 2004 and the second from 2009 to 2014.

Political career

Role in national politics

Assis challenged incumbent António José Seguro for the party leadership in 2011.

When the right-wing coalition government of Prime Minister Pedro Passos Coelho lost its absolute majority in parliament as a result of the 2015 legislative election, Assis condemned "left-wing fantasies" within his own Socialist Party, describing any attempt at an agreement with the Communists and the Left Bloc as "absurd". However, on 24 November, Socialist leader António Costa was appointed as Prime Minister after forming a parliamentary alliance with three left-wing parties. Assis has since been publicly voicing his staunch opposition against the new coalition agreement, which he has reaffirmed in the context of the October 2017 local elections and wildfires' aftermath.

Member of the European Parliament (2014–2019)
Ahead of the 2014 European elections, the Socialist Party named Assis at the top of their list. Following elections, he became a member of the Committee on Foreign Affairs and the Subcommittee on Human Rights. He was also the chairman of the parliament's delegation for relations with Mercosur.
	
Assis has been a political commentator for television programmes on TV stations SIC Notícias and TVI 24 and a columnist for the newspaper Público.

References

External links
 

1965 births
People from Amarante, Portugal
Living people
Mayors of places in Portugal
Members of the Assembly of the Republic (Portugal)
Socialist Party (Portugal) MEPs
MEPs for Portugal 2004–2009
MEPs for Portugal 2014–2019
University of Porto alumni